Eastern Airways, legally incorporated as Air Kilroe Limited, is a British regional airline whose head office is at Humberside Airport near the village of Kirmington, North Lincolnshire, England. It operates domestic, international and private charter services. Around 800,000 passengers a year are carried on the scheduled route network.

It has crew bases at Aberdeen, Humberside, Newquay and Southampton.
Air Kilroe Limited (trading as Eastern Airways) holds a United Kingdom Civil Aviation Authority Type A Operating Licence. It is permitted to carry passengers, cargo and mail on aircraft with 20 or more seats and is IOSA approved.

History

Early years
Co-founded by Bryan Huxford and Richard Lake, the airline started operations in December 1997 with a scheduled service between Humberside and Aberdeen by a leased Swearingen Metro, following KLM UK's withdrawal from the route. In February 1999, it purchased Manchester based Air Kilroe, granting the company an Air Operator's Certificate and giving the airline a fleet of two BAe Jetstream 32 aircraft.

In 2002, the first BAe Jetstream 41 entered the Eastern fleet, the aircraft type which now forms the majority of the fleet. Twelve aircraft and their associated routes were transferred from British Airways CitiExpress on 30 March 2003 giving Eastern a springboard into many regional UK airports which have now become aircraft bases.

In 2003 an Embraer 145 and 135 were wet leased from City Airline to compete on some longer routes. They were then replaced with Saab 2000 aircraft. Since 2003, the company has acquired 8 further Saab 2000 aircraft from Crossair and other European carriers and a number of additional Jetstream 41 aircraft from American regional carriers.

In 2006, Eastern Airways wet leased a Dornier 328 from Cirrus Airlines to operate a Newcastle to London City service which has since been terminated. Eastern Airways also purchased a Jetstream 41 training simulator.

As part of One North East's "Passionate People Passionate Places" campaign for North East England, Eastern Airways had a Jetstream 41 painted in promotional colours. It also featured in the 2007 Sunderland International Airshow. A Saab 2000 is also painted in a promotional 'Aberdeen City and Shire' colour scheme. The airline closed its base at the Isle of Man in August 2009, discontinuing routes to Birmingham and Newcastle from the airport.

Developments since 2010
In July 2010, the airline took delivery of an Embraer 135 with 37 seats and signed a lease on a second, thus adding jet aircraft to their fleet for the first time since the acquisition to replace their previously operated Embraer ERJ aircraft. They will be used mainly on charter services to central and Eastern Europe; however, they will also offer increased flexibility on the airline's scheduled services. Also in July 2010 the airline named one of their Jetstream 41 aircraft after the comedian Ken Dodd in celebration of the year anniversary of the start of scheduled services from Liverpool and Dodd's support shown in the region. In September 2010, it was announced that Eastern Airways had bought Air Southwest. 

In August 2012, Eastern Group purchased the 82% Manchester Airports Group stake in Humberside Airport. In February 2014 the Bristow Group, a major helicopter operator serving the offshore oil and gas industry acquired a 60% interest in Eastern Airways and in 2018 acquired the remaining 40%. The airline continued to operate under the Eastern Airways brand. Bristow also acquired a controlling interest in the Australian airline Airnorth, another regional airline which operates fixed wing regional jet and turboprop aircraft.

It was announced on 21 September 2017 that Eastern Airways would enter a franchise with Flybe, starting on 29 October 2017. The franchise saw all scheduled flights operated by Eastern Airways carry BE (Flybe) flight numbers. Also in September 2017, Eastern received its first of two new ATR 72-600. The aircraft operated on the Aberdeen - Scatsta route on behalf of Bristow Helicopters. With the Bristow Group in financial difficulties, it sold the Eastern Airlines group of companies back to one of its founders, Richard Lake, in May 2019.

On 5 March 2020, Flybe was placed into administration. All flights operated by Flybe and Stobart Air were cancelled, but those operated on a franchise basis by Eastern Airways and Blue Islands continued. Eastern Airways announced that it would resume independent operation of its existing scheduled routes, along with three additional routes formerly operated by Flybe.

Corporate affairs

Headquarters
The head office is located at Schiphol House, on the property of Humberside Airport, in Kirmington, North Lincolnshire.

Awards
 European Regions Airline Association Airline of the Year Silver Award 2003/04 and 2004/05 
 European Regions Airline Association Airline of the Year Gold Award 2006/07 
 Baltic Air Charter Association Best Passenger Charter Airline 2011
 European Regions Airline Association Airline of the Year Gold Award 2014

Destinations 

Since 2008, Eastern Airways has been providing fixed wing services to and from Aberdeen and Scatsta in Shetland. The flights are used to transport oil workers employed by the companies that make up the IAC consortium. Eastern Airways supply fixed wing operations on behalf of Bristow Helicopters. Bristow Helicopters are responsible for providing all air transportation and ground handling services. In 2010, the contract with Bristow was extended to 2015. The contract to Scatsta ended, however, Eastern continued to provide fixed wing services to Sumburgh instead.

Codeshare agreements 
Eastern Airways has codeshare agreements with the following airlines:

N/A

Fleet

Current fleet

Former fleet 
Eastern Airways formerly operated the following aircraft:

 British Aerospace BAe Jetstream 31 (Super 31 version)
 British Aerospace BAe Jetstream 32
 de Havilland Canada DHC-8-300 Dash 8
 Dornier 328
 Embraer 135
 Embraer 145
 Saab 2000
 Short 330

Notes

References

External links 

 Official website

Airlines of the United Kingdom
European Regions Airline Association
Airlines established in 1997
1997 establishments in England
Companies based in the Borough of North Lincolnshire
Bristow Helicopters
British companies established in 1997